Bridge of Don may refer to:

 Bridge of Don, Aberdeen, Scotland, UK; a suburb of Aberdeen
 Bridge of Don (ward), Aberdeen, Scotland, UK; a ward of Aberdeen
 Bridge of Don (bridge), Aberdeen, Scotland, UK; a bridge over the River Don
 Bridge of Don Academy, Bridge of Don, Aberdeen, Scotland, UK; a secondary school

See also

 
 Don Bridge (disambiguation)
 Don River Bridge (disambiguation)
 Don River (disambiguation)
 Don (disambiguation)